Litter-Robot is a gravity-driven sifting automatic litter box manufactured and distributed by Whisker based in Auburn Hills, Michigan.

History 
Litter-Robot was first released in 2000. Brad Baxter, who brought the product to market, licensed an existing patent and developed the device. He funded the first generation of the Litter-Robot with an investment from his parents. Baxter sold the Litter-Robot online directly to consumers, and the business became profitable in 2005. There have been two additional models of the Litter-Robot since its release.
In 2019, Litter-Robot manufacturer Whisker (formerly AutoPets) raised $31 million in growth equity financing from Chicago-based Pondera Holdings LLC. In 2021, the company increased its manufacturing footprint by 60 percent and invested $9 million in its plant in Juneau, Wisconsin.

The product is sold in ten countries, including in the United States, United Kingdom, the European Union, and China. The company has more than 300 full-time employees in the United States.

Reception 
Good Housekeeping called Litter-Robot 3 “the best overall self-cleaning litter box.” The product earned a “Paw of Approval” from The Dodo. The Spruce rated it “excellent“ with 4.5 stars. Wirecutter called it “the best automatic cat litter box,” but nonetheless did not recommend it.

References

External links 
 Official site

Cats as pets
Pet equipment